Blue Plate Special is the fifth studio album by Canadian country music group Prairie Oyster. It was released by Velvel Records on August 28, 1996. The album peaked at number 5 on the RPM Country Albums chart.

Track listing
"She Won't Be Lonely Long" (Keith Glass) – 3:31
"What'cha Gonna Do?" (Glass) – 3:37
"The Water's Deep" (Russell deCarle) – 4:11
"If My Broken Heart Would Ever Mend" (Joan Besen) – 2:38
"Tonight There's a Blue Moon" (deCarle) – 4:57
"Long Gone Daddy" (John Paul Allen, Glass) – 3:07
"In the Summertime (You Don't Want My Love)" (Roger Miller) – 2:34
"Unbelievable Love" (Besen) – 3:32
"Sunday Drivers" (Allen) – 0:55
"There She Goes" (Besen) – 3:33
"One Way Track" (Willie P. Bennett, deCarle) – 5:38
"Into the Blue" (Glass) – 3:25

Chart performance

References

1996 albums
Prairie Oyster albums